Augrabies schotiaphaga is a species of beetle in the family Buprestidae, the only species in the genus Augrabies.

References 

Buprestidae
Beetles described in 1987